Megachile clotho is a species of bee in the family Megachilidae. It was described by Smith in 1861.

References

Clotho
Insects described in 1861